City of Thieves may refer to:

 City of Thieves (gamebook), a 1983 single-player adventure gamebook written by Ian Livingstone
 City of Thieves (album), an album released by Sonic Boom Six
 City of Thieves (novel), a 2008 historical fiction novel by David Benioff
 City of Thieves, an episode in the first season of Adventure Time